"Turn Back Time" is a song by American DJ and record producer Diplo and Australian producer Sonny Fodera. It was released on November 20, 2020, via Higher Ground Records. Diplo and Sonny wrote the song with King Henry and Sasha Sloan, the latter providing uncredited vocals, and co-produced it.

Background
In a press release, Fodera explained: "Turn Back Time' was born out of a late night session with me & Diplo. I was on tour in LA at the time, playing some amazing shows, meeting some really cool people and feeling super inspired by my surroundings. I played Turn Back Time in some of my last live shows and the response was so crazy, we knew we had to release it!"

Composition
Nina Chiang of EDMTunes explained that the track includes "old-school piano riffs, plus a sexy deep bassline", and described it is "a catchy, deep house track." The song is written in the key of B♭ Minor, with a tempo of 124 beats per minute.

Music video
The music video was released on February 11, 2021. According to the description by Rugby Scruggs of Dancing Astronaut, the video follows "an office employee who can't seem to escape a mysterious woman."

Credits and personnel
Credits adapted from AllMusic.

 Henry Allen – composer
 Diplo – composer, primary Artist, producer, programmer
 Sonny Fodera – composer, primary Artist, producer, programmer
 Cass Irvine – mastering
 Noizu – producer, remix engineer
 Sasha Sloan – composer, vocalist

Charts

Weekly charts

Year-end charts

References

2020 songs
2020 singles
Diplo songs
Songs written by Diplo
Songs written by Sasha Alex Sloan
Song recordings produced by Diplo
Deep house songs